The 3rd New York Provisional Cavalry Regiment was a cavalry regiment that served in the Union Army at  the end of the  American Civil War.

Service
On August 17, 1865, the 13th New York Volunteer Cavalry was consolidated with the 16th New York Volunteer Cavalry to form the 3rd New York Provisional Cavalry. Col. Nelson B. Sweitzer, commanding officer of the 16th New York, was appointed commander of the new regiment.

The 3rd Provisional NY Cavalry was honorably discharged and mustered out on September 21, 1865, at Camp Barry near Washington, D. C., having lost by death from disease and other causes, four enlisted men.

See also
List of New York Civil War regiments

Notes

References
The Civil War Archive
New York State Military Museum and Veterans Research Center - 3rd Provisional Regiment of Cavalry – Civil War

Cavalry 003
1865 establishments in New York (state)
Military units and formations established in 1865
Military units and formations disestablished in 1865